Adrian Hickmott (born 30 March 1972) is an Australian rules football coach and former player. He is currently an assistant coach with the Hawthorn Football Club. As a player, he played with the Geelong Football Club and Carlton Football Club in the Australian Football League.

Hickmott was a utility player who had a tough style of play. He was usually used up forward but was also seen across half back.

He started his career with Geelong in 1992 and played in the 1995 Grand Final loss to Carlton. It turned out to be his final game for the club and he was traded to the side that won the Grand Final, Carlton.

With 22 games in his debut season at Carlton he won their award for best first year player, adding 17 more games the following year. Due to a knee injury he missed all of the 1998 season and in 1999 he played in another Grand Final, this time losing to North Melbourne.

In 2000 he kicked a career high of 27 goals for the year. The next season saw him gather 10 Brownlow Medal votes, the equal most by a Carlton player that season. For the next two years he was vice captain of the club and at the end of 2003 he was forced to retire after suffering a groin injury.

Hickmott was a development coach at the Essendon Football Club and until recently was serving as the backline coach at the West Coast Eagles. After serving as an assistant coach for West Coast over the past 10 years in a variety of different roles, including backline coach, contested ball coordinator and midfield coach, Hickmott joined the Hawthorn Football Club at the end of 2021.

Statistics

|- style=background:#EAEAEA
| 1992 ||  || 42
| 3 || 1 || 1 || 19 || 15 || 34 || 10 || 5 || 0.3 || 0.3 || 6.3 || 5.0 || 11.3 || 3.3 || 1.7 || 0
|-
| 1993 ||  || 42
| 8 || 5 || 5 || 49 || 47 || 96 || 28 || 15 || 0.6 || 0.6 || 6.1 || 5.9 || 12.0 || 3.5 || 1.9 || 1
|- style=background:#EAEAEA
| 1994 ||  || 42
| 20 || 8 || 11 || 139 || 146 || 285 || 64 || 38 || 0.4 || 0.6 || 7.0 || 7.3 || 14.3 || 3.2 || 1.9 || 0
|-
| 1995 ||  || 42
| 19 || 10 || 15 || 131 || 101 || 232 || 92 || 21 || 0.5 || 0.8 || 6.9 || 5.3 || 12.2 || 4.8 || 1.1 || 3
|- style=background:#EAEAEA
| 1996 ||  || 9
| 22 || 13 || 10 || 219 || 143 || 362 || 91 || 43 || 0.6 || 0.5 || 10.0 || 6.5 || 16.5 || 4.1 || 2.0 || 5
|-
| 1997 ||  || 9
| 17 || 5 || 3 || 200 || 96 || 296 || 92 || 27 || 0.3 || 0.2 || 11.8 || 5.6 || 17.4 || 5.4 || 1.6 || 2
|- style=background:#EAEAEA
| 1998 ||  || 9
| 0 || — || — || — || — || — || — || — || — || — || — || — || — || — || — || 0
|-
| 1999 ||  || 9
| 19 || 6 || 4 || 121 || 95 || 216 || 72 || 19 || 0.3 || 0.2 || 6.4 || 5.0 || 11.4 || 3.8 || 1.0 || 0
|- style=background:#EAEAEA
| 2000 ||  || 9
| 21 || 27 || 12 || 226 || 184 || 410 || 130 || 63 || 1.3 || 0.6 || 10.8 || 8.8 || 19.5 || 6.2 || 3.0 || 2
|-
| 2001 ||  || 9
| 23 || 22 || 16 || 277 || 183 || 460 || 145 || 83 || 1.0 || 0.7 || 12.0 || 8.0 || 20.0 || 6.3 || 3.6 || 10
|- style=background:#EAEAEA
| 2002 ||  || 9
| 17 || 14 || 5 || 125 || 130 || 255 || 88 || 47 || 0.8 || 0.3 || 7.4 || 7.6 || 15.0 || 5.2 || 2.8 || 0
|-
| 2003 ||  || 9
| 15 || 20 || 10 || 101 || 60 || 161 || 37 || 22 || 1.3 || 0.7 || 6.7 || 4.0 || 10.7 || 2.5 || 1.5 || 0
|- class="sortbottom"
! colspan=3| Career
! 184 !! 131 !! 92 !! 1607 !! 1200 !! 2807 !! 849 !! 383 !! 0.7 !! 0.5 !! 8.7 !! 6.5 !! 15.3 !! 4.6 !! 2.1 !! 23
|}

Honours and achievements
Team
 Minor premiership: 1992

References

Holmesby, Russell and Main, Jim (2007). The Encyclopedia of AFL Footballers. 7th ed. Melbourne: Bas Publishing.

External links

1972 births
Living people
Australian rules footballers from Victoria (Australia)
Geelong Football Club players
Carlton Football Club players
Shepparton Football Club players
Horsham Football Club players